The Sustainable Development Investment Partnership (SDIP) is a partnership whose aim is to support to financing the Sustainable Development Goals (SDGs) set out by the United Nations. The SDIP brings together public, private and philanthropic entities—from both developed and developing countries—that share an ambition to scale up sustainable infrastructure investments in developing countries. The SDIP was launched at the United Nations Conference on Financing for Development in Addis Ababa in July 2015 with 20 founding members, which has since expanded to 42. The World Economic Forum and OECD were founding partners and provide institutional support.

The SDIP was set up to help coordinate finance as members recognised the space was often uncoordinated. According to the SDIP the aim is to adopt a practical approach and deliver scale, speed, transaction efficiency and risk mitigation. Their public goal is to achieve 100 billion dollars per year of additional finance over five years. SDIP supports inclusive growth and poverty alleviation through investments in areas such as water and sanitation systems, transportation, clean energy, agriculture, health, telecommunications and climate adaptation.

The SDIP uses blended finance by creating a platform where public and private entities can interact by co-investing and coordinating on specific projects. In order to mobilize private sector investment, members of the partnership collaborate to review practical experience in individual investment projects with a view toward scaling up existing initiatives, sharing existing knowledge, tools and new approaches to financing.

SDIP's inaugural meeting took place in Geneva, Switzerland on 15 September 2015.

Membership
SDIP has 42 members. The partnership is open to governments, local and global private banks, institutional investors and other public and private financiers, development finance institutions and bilateral and multilateral development banks and other organizations seeking to providing resources to support the various activities of the partnership. Some members include:

Agence française de développement (AFD)
Bill & Melinda Gates Foundation 
Government of Canada
Citigroup
Government of Denmark
Development Bank of South Africa (DBSA)
Deutsche Bank
East Capital
European Investment Bank (EIB)
European Bank for Reconstruction and Development (EBRD)
FMO
HSBC
Inter-American Development Bank (IDB)
Industrial Development Corporation (IDC)
International Finance Corporation (IFC)
The Investment Fund for Developing Countries (IFU) 
Japan International Cooperation Agency (JICA)
Meridiam
Multilateral Investment Guarantee Agency (MIGA)
Government of the Netherlands
Government of Norway
Pension Danmark
Pensionskassernes Administration (PKA)
The Sovereign Fund for Strategic Investment (FONSIS)
Standard Chartered
Storebrand
 Sumitomo Mitsui Banking Corporation (SMBC)
Government of Sweden
Government of the United Kingdom
United States Agency for International Development (USAID)

Africa and ASEAN hubs
Because of the focus on bridging the funding gap towards the SDGs, a large share of the projects are located in Sub-Saharan Africa. Of the $30 billion projects SDIP is facilitating worldwide, over $20 billion are located across the continent. Consequently, the partnership has dedicated an African hub within which the partnership is looking to build local capacity and ease the exchange of best practices across its network of institutions.

An ASEAN hub was also launched in 2017.

See also
 Blended finance

References

Sustainability organizations